Laxman Giluwa (20 December 1964 – 29 April 2021) was an Indian politician and president of the Jharkhand unit of Bharatiya Janata Party. He was a politician from Jharkhand state of India and member of the 13th Lok Sabha from Singhbhum constituency during 1999–2004.
He belonged to the Bharatiya Janata Party. He was contesting in the 2014 Lok Sabha election from Singhbhum district from Bharatiya Janata Party.

Personal life
He married on 10 August 1996, to Malati Giluwa and had two sons and two daughters. He received a B.Com from the Ranchi University, Ranchi (Bihar).

Giluwa died from COVID-19 in April 2021.

Positions held
1991	 Member, District Council, Ernakulam, Kerala

1999	 Elected to 13th Lok Sabha

1999-2000	 Member, Committee on Science and Technology, Environment and Forests

2000-2004	 Member, Consultative Committee, Ministry of Railways

References

1964 births
2021 deaths
India MPs 1999–2004
People from West Singhbhum district
India MPs 2014–2019
Lok Sabha members from Jharkhand
Bharatiya Janata Party politicians from Jharkhand
Deaths from the COVID-19 pandemic in India